Tau Lewis (born 1993 in Toronto, Ontario) is a Canadian artist working in a variety of mediums including hand-sewn, carved and assemblage pieces.

Artwork
 
Lewis currently works with soft materials such as fabric scraps. She uses recycling because it is circular and has roots in her ancestry. In Lewis's most recent work “The T.A.U.B.I.S.” she uses a range of materials from recycled and hand dyed fabrics, recycled leather, cotton batting, beads, acrylic paint, PVA, glue, metal hoop skirt, and pipes, to sea shells. In Lewis's twelve-foot-long quilt (the sighting of the last shadow dweller (original sea kin)) the quilt is stitched together using materials such as leather and reclaimed fabric to evoke aquatic systems. The various materials used are stitched together irregularly with no uniform shape or pattern reminiscent of the flowing of water. When examined up close elements of the body emerge from the quilt the fragments of the body act as elements of DNA in the work. Lewis's use of reclaimed scraps and materials connects with histories of resourcefulness and is environmentally conscious. Lewis's earlier work used materials such as “wood, scrap metal, cement, wire, plaster, stones, paint cans, chains and rebar, her latest work relaxes further into fabric.” Using the globally sourced materials she creates a sense of community and ancestry in the work.

In 2018, Lewis was awarded the Frieze Frame Stand Prize for her solo presentation with Cooper Cole Gallery at Frieze New York City, USA.

Tau Lewis is represented by Night Gallery, Los Angeles, and Stephen Freidman Gallery, London, UK.

Exhibitions
In 2018, Lewis had her first institutional solo exhibition in Canada in the Agnes Etherington Art Centre. In 2021 Lewis' sculpture "Symphony" was exhibited in the Rotunda of the National Gallery of Canada in Ottawa as part of its Contemporary Projects series.

References

External links 
 

1993 births
Living people
Artists from Toronto
Canadian women sculptors
Feminist artists
Canadian contemporary artists
Contemporary sculptors
Queer artists
Queer feminists
Canadian people of Jamaican descent
Canadian LGBT artists
Black Canadian women
Black Canadian LGBT people
Black Canadian artists
21st-century Canadian women artists
21st-century Canadian LGBT people